Newquay Cricket Club is an English cricket club based in Newquay, Cornwall, who play their home matches at Newquay Sports Centre. The club's first, second, third and fourth teams compete in the ECB Cornwall Cricket League.

Significant players with first-class experience who have played at Newquay include; Trevor Garwe (Mashonaland & Zimbabwe), Omesh Wijesiriwardana (Sri Lanka A), Dylan De Beer (Manicaland), Rory Coutts (Gauteng & Guernsey), Ryan Driver (Worcs and Lancs) & Timothy Walton (Essex & Northamptonshire).

As of 2021, Newquay CC 1st XI compete in the Cornwall Cricket League's County 1 Division.

Honours
Honours for Newquay Cricket Club include:
 League Champions: 2003
 Hawkey Cup Winners: 2003,2006,2009
 Edwards Cup Winners: 2003

External links

 Newquay Cricket Club season results & statistics
 Newquay Cricket Club Home Web Page

Newquay
English club cricket teams
Cricket in Cornwall